EM, Em or em may refer to:

Arts and entertainment

Music
 EM, the E major musical scale
 Em, the E minor musical scale
 Electronic music, music that employs electronic musical instruments and electronic music technology in its production
 Encyclopedia Metallum, an online metal music database
 Eminem, American rapper

Other uses in arts and entertainment
 Em (comic strip), a comic strip by Maria Smedstad

Companies and organizations
 Aero Benin (IATA code), a defunct airline
 Empire Airlines (IATA code), a charter and cargo airline based in Idaho, US
 Erasmus Mundus, an international student-exchange program
 Estado de Minas, a Brazilian newspaper
 European Movement, an international lobbying association
 ExxonMobil, a large oil company formed from the merger of Exxon and Mobil in 1999
 La République En Marche! (sometimes shortened to "En Marche!"), a major French political party

Economics
 Emerging markets, nations undergoing rapid industrialization

Language and typography

Language
 M, a letter of the modern Latin alphabet, in English and other languages
 Em (Cyrillic) (М / м), a letter of the Cyrillic alphabet
 Em (digraph), a digraph in Portuguese
 Em, the third-person singular oblique Spivak pronoun

Typography
 em (typography), a unit of measurement
 em dash, a dash that is one em wide
 em space or mutton, a space that is one em wide

Management
 Emergency management, a discipline that studies dealing with and avoiding risks
 Energy management, planning and operation of energy production and energy consumption units
 Environmental management, the management of the interaction of human societies with the environment

Places
 El Monte, California, a city in the United States
 El Monte, Chile, a city in Chile

Science

Biology
 Effective microorganisms, a series of products intended to improve soil quality and plant growth
 Extracellular matrix, the connective tissue supporting cells in multicellular organisms
 Membrane potential (Em), of a cell

Computing
 , emphasis HTML element
 End of medium, ISO C0 control code ^Y
 Empirical modelling
 em (typography), a unit of measurement in Web design
 eM Client E-Mail client

Medicine
 Emergency medicine, a medical specialty dealing with acute illnesses and injuries that require immediate attention
 Erythema multiforme, a skin condition that usually follows an antecedent infection or drug exposure
 Erythromelalgia, a disorder that typically affects the skin of the feet and/or hands, causing redness, heat and pain
Extensive metabolizer, a term used in pharmacogenomics to refer to individuals with normal metabolic activity

Physics
Exametre or exameter (Em), an SI unit of length equal to 1018 metres
Electromagnetic spectrum, the range of all possible frequencies of electromagnetic radiation
Electromigration, the transport of conducting solid material caused by electric current through it
Electromagnetism, one of the fundamental physical forces
Electromechanics, combines electrical engineering and mechanical engineering

Other uses in science and technology
 Nikon EM, an SLR camera made by the Nikon Corporation in the late 1970s
 Electron microscope, a type of microscope that uses electrons to "illuminate" a specimen and create an enlarged image
 Electron multiplier, a vacuum-tube structure that multiplies incident charges by means of secondary emission
 Electronic monitoring, a form of surveillance used in criminal justice
 Atlantic Equatorial mode, a climate pattern of the Atlantic Ocean
 Expectation–maximization algorithm, an algorithm for finding maximum likelihood estimates of parameters in probabilistic models

Other uses
 Electrician's mate, an occupational rating in the U.S. Navy and U.S. Coast Guard
 David Em (born 1952), an American computer art pioneer
 EM gauge, a scale used in model railways
 Etymologicum Magnum, in the bibliography of the largest Byzantine lexicon